The Logistic Regiment "Aosta" is a military logistics regiment of the Italian Army based in Palermo in Sicily. The regiment was formed on 1 June 2015 and is the logistic unit of the Mechanized Brigade "Aosta".

History

Logistic Battalion "Aosta" 

The newly formed Logistic Regiment "Aosta" received the flag and traditions of the Logistic Battalion "Aosta", which had been formed as Services Unit "Aosta" on 1 February 1957 in Messina by merging the logistic support units of the Infantry Division "Aosta". The unit repeatedly changed composition and name until the 1975 army reform, when it became the Logistic Battalion "Aosta" and was granted a new flag on 12 November 1976 by decree 846 of the President of the Italian Republic Giovanni Leone.

Initially consisting of a command platoon, a supply and transport company, a medium workshop, and a field park the battalion was reorganized on 1 October 1981 and consisted from then until being disbanded of the following units:

  Battalion Command, in Messina
 Command and Services Company
 Supply Company
 Medium Transport Company
 Maintenance Company
 Medical (Reserve) Unit

On 1 February 2002 the battalion was disbanded its flag transferred to the Shrine of the Flags in the Vittoriano in Rome, where it remained until November 2015.

Current structure 
Like all Italian Army brigade logistic units the Logistic Regiment "Aosta" consists of:

  Regimental Command, in Palermo
 Logistic Battalion
 Command
 Tactical Control Squad
 Supply Company
 Transport Company
 Maintenance Company
 Command and Logistic Support Company
 C3 Platoon
 Transport and Materiel Platoon
 Deployment Support Platoon
 Commissariat Platoon
 Garrison Support Unit

The Regimental Command consists of the Commandant's and Personnel Office, the Operations, Training and Information Office, the Logistic Office, and the Administration Office.

See also 
 Military logistics

External links
Italian Army Website: Reggimento Logistico "Aosta"

References 

Logistic Regiments of Italy